Mehmet Usta (born 20 February 1973) is a Turkish actor.

Life and career
Usta was born in Düzce. His family is from Trabzon and they moved to Istanbul when he was one year old. He finished his primary and secondary education at Aksaray Mahmudiye School, after which he attended Istanbul Davutpaşa High School. He completed his bachelor's degree at the School of Arts and Sciences of Marmara University and earned his master's degree in the Department of Sociology and Anthropology at Marmara University Institute of Social Sciences, in the field of Art Sociology with the thesis "Traditional Turkish Theater on the Axis of Modernity and Modernization". He was interested in Far East Martial Arts before enrolling in university. After finishing his education, he started appearing on stage and soon made his debut in cinema and television.

He rose to prominence with his television roles as "Ölü" in Ekmek Teknesi and as "Şoker" in Fox's Bez Bebek. He then starred in the TRT 1 series Leyla ile Mecnun as "Kamil", before portraying the character of "Gomodor" in Fox's Dedemin Dolabı. He subsequently starred in Bir Yusuf Masalı as "İkram". In 2021, he was cast in a leading role in the action drama TV series Teşkilat as Zayed Fadi.

Filmography

References

External links 
 

1973 births
Turkish male stage actors
Turkish male television actors
Turkish male film actors
Marmara University alumni
Living people